Ferdinand Heinrich Johann Haschkowetz (14 August 1902 – 7 August 1946), known by the stage name Ferdinand Marian, was an Austrian actor. Though a prolific stage actor in Berlin and a popular matinée idol throughout the 1930s and early '40s, he is best remembered for playing the lead role of Joseph Süß Oppenheimer in the notorious Nazi propaganda film Jud Süß (1940).

Early life and career
Born in Vienna, the son of an opera singer, Marian turned to the stage early, though he never attended any drama classes. He ran away from home and abandoned his studies as an engineer to work as an extra at several Austrian and German theatres. In 1938 he joined the ensemble of the Deutsches Theater in Berlin, where he was acclaimed for his performance as Iago in Shakespeare's Othello.

Marian had also appeared in movies like Curtis Bernhardt's Der Tunnel since 1933, and had his breakthrough starring together with Zarah Leander in 1937's La Habanera, directed by Douglas Sirk. His role as the suave but amoral Don Pedro Avila added to his image as an adorable but devious womanizer.

Jud Süß 
Marian's career was overshadowed by his appearance as the title character in Jud Süß, a notorious antisemitic German movie directed by Veit Harlan. This 1940 film, made under the supervision of Propaganda Minister Joseph Goebbels, is widely considered to be one of the most hateful depictions of Jews in film. Several top stars had rejected the title role; Marian, urged by Goebbels and fearing consequences by the Reichsfilmkammer, did not dare to refuse.

His depiction of the title character followed Nazi propaganda stereotypes of Jews as being materialistic, immoral, cunning and untrustworthy. With the exception of Marian's character – who shaved off his beard and wore Gentile attire for most of the story – the actors playing Jewish male characters were made up to look unappealing and alien (non-German). There were also scenes that purported to show Jewish religious services, which were in fact largely fabricated by the filmmakers.

The film was a great success, both commercially and ideologically. Heinrich Himmler ordered that the film be shown to SS units about to be sent against Jews, to non-Jewish populations of areas where Jews were about to be deported, and to concentration camp guards. Stefan Baretzki, a guard at Auschwitz concentration camp, later said that after they were shown Jud Süß and similar films, guards would beat up Jewish prisoners the next day.

Marian's willing participation in Jud Süß and his belief in its message remains contentious. During his lifetime he was considered apolitical, never holding membership in any political party or expressing support for Nazism. His personal life seemingly contradicted the antisemitism of his best-known role. He had a daughter from his first marriage to Jewish pianist Irene Saager. His second wife's former husband Julius Gellner was also Jewish and Marian and his wife protected him from reprisals by hiding him in their home.

Friedrich Knilli, author of the Marian biography Ich war Jud Süß – Die Geschichte des Filmstars Ferdinand Marian ('I was Jud Suss - The Story of the Movie Star Ferdinand Marian') indicated that Marian acted was at minimum pressured and at maximum coerced by Goebbles into participating in the film, which he had initially considered distasteful, through implicit threats against his family. Knilli's assertions match those of director Veit Harlan, who claimed in a war crimes trial that he was coerced by Goebbles into making the film, and attempted to minimize or sanitize the antisemitic elements to little avail.

According to Knilli, Marian never came to terms with his involvement in the film, and the guilt lead to a spiraling pattern of alcoholism that dominated his later life.

Later roles 
The same year as Jud Süß, Marian starred in another propaganda film directed by Veit Harlan, Ohm Krüger. The film was a biopic of Boer political leader Paul Kruger, and portrayed the British as the villains of the Second Boer War, with Marian playing British mastermind Cecil Rhodes. The film co-starred Emil Jannings and Gustaf Gründgens, who both had rejected the role of Jud Süß the year before. 

In 1943 he starred as Cagliostro in Josef von Báky's fantasy comedy Münchhausen, in Romance in a Minor Key, in Tonelli.

Death 
Marian died in a road accident in 1946 near the village of Dürneck (today part of Freising) in Bavaria, probably driving under the influence of alcohol. It is said that he was on his way to Munich with a borrowed car to collect denazification papers that with the permission of US film officer Eric Pleskow would allow him to work again, having celebrated this news just beforehand. Friedrich Knilli suggested the death was suicide, as Marian had been unable to cope with his participation in Jud Süß.

In popular culture 
Marian is played by Tobias Moretti in the 2010 film Jew Suss: Rise and Fall, a biopic about the production and release of Jud Süß, based on Friedrich Knilli's biography. 

The film takes many liberties with the true story, fictionalizing Marian's personal life by combining his two wives into a single character, and expanding the role of Julius Gellner (renamed 'Wilhelm Adolf Deutscher').

Filmography 
 The Tunnel (1933, dir. Curtis Bernhardt) as The Agitator
 A Wedding Dream (1936, dir. Erich Engel) as Paul Puschkinow
 The Voice of the Heart (1937, dir. Karlheinz Martin) as Prince Konstantin
 Madame Bovary  (1937, dir. Gerhard Lamprecht) as Rodolphe Boulanger
 La Habanera (1937, dir. Douglas Sirk) as Don Pedro de Havila
 Nordlicht (1938, dir. Herbert B. Fredersdorf) as Halvard
 Der Vierte kommt nicht (1939, dir. Max W. Kimmich) as Generaldirektor Kolman
 Morgen werde ich verhaftet (1939, dir. Karl Heinz Stroux) as Juan Perez
 Dein Leben gehört mir (1939, dir. Johannes Meyer)
 The Fox of Glenarvon (1940, dir. Max W. Kimmich) as Justice of the peace Grandison
 Aus erster Ehe (1940, dir. Paul Verhoeven) as Professor Walter Helmerding
 Jud Süß (1940, dir. Veit Harlan) as Joseph Süß Oppenheimer
 Ohm Krüger (1941, dir. Hans Steinhoff) as Cecil Rhodes
 Ein Zug fährt ab (1942, dir. Johannes Meyer) as Michael Garden
 Münchhausen (1943, dir. Josef von Báky) as Count Cagliostro
 Romance in a Minor Key (1943, dir. Helmut Käutner) as Michael
 Tonelli  (1943, dir. Viktor Tourjansky) as Tonio Torelli / Jaro
 Reise in die Vergangenheit (1943, dir. Hans H. Zerlett) as Carlo Ernst
 In flagranti (1944, dir. Hans Schweikart) as Ing. Alfred Peters
 Freunde (1944, dir. E. W. Emo) as Guido
 Night of the Twelve (1945, dir. Hans Schweikart) as Agent Leopold Lenski
 Dreimal Komödie (1945, dir. Viktor Tourjansky) as Professor Viktor Arnim
  (1945, dir. Hans Schweikart) as Baron Pistolecran (final film role)

References

External links
 
 Short biography of Ferdinand Marian
 Der Schauspieler Ferdinand Marian (in German)
 Photographs and literature

1902 births
1946 deaths
Austrian male film actors
Austrian male stage actors
Male actors from Vienna
20th-century Austrian male actors
Road incident deaths in Germany